Chiricahua is a band of Apache Native Americans.

Chiricahua may also refer to:
 Chiricahua language
 The Chiricahua Mountains, in southeastern Arizona
 Chiricahua National Monument
 Chiricahua National Forest 
 Chiricahua Peak
 UV-20 Chiricahua, a U.S. Army aircraft
 Chiricahua (moth), a genus in the family Geometridae
 The CH strain of Drosophila pseudoobscura  see Drosophila pseudoobscura § Chiricahua